Phrom Phiram murder case (1977) was a rape-murder crime case on July 27, 1977, in Phrom Phiram district, Phitsanulok Province in Thailand, in which an unnamed girl was kidnapped, raped, and murdered by more than 30 perpetrators. Initially, Royal Thai Police did not investigate the case and summarily concluded that it was an accident. Only after 20 villagers in the district had contacted journalists before the case was reopened. At the end of the investigation, 30 villagers were found to be perpetrators, but only ten would be convicted while the rest were acquitted due to the lack of evidence.

Popular culture
Film adaptations
 Macabre Case of Prom Pi Ram, a 2003 biographical film directed by Manop Udomdej starring Pimpan Chalaikupp as the unnamed girl.

References

1977 murders in Thailand
Female murder victims
Rape in Thailand
Gang rape in Asia